Vishkanya Ek Anokhi Prem Kahani or simply Vishkanya (lit. venomous girl) is a soap set in the old neighbourhood of the city of Kolkata. The show is about supernatural love story of fictional characters Aparajita Ghosh and Malay Mittal.

Plot
Aparajita is born as a Vishkanya, a venomous girl, whose body including her bodily fluids is poisonous and could prove fatal to anyone on contact. Initially she was not aware of the fact that she was a poisonous girl or that she was used as a pawn to destroy Mittal's family by her maternal aunt (Kalpana Ghosh) who she thought was her mother. Her mother had kept her locked in her room since she was a little girl, avoiding any contact with outsiders. This ignited curiosity from her neighbors, especially Malay.

The first time she was allowed out was for a party in Mittal's mansion, where she met Malay for the first time. Malay was instantly smitten by her beauty and delicate grace despite her mysterious aura. A series of events led Aparajita to begin questioning her true identity. She demanded answers from her mother about the unexplained facts such as her skin turning into bright blue whenever she felt conflict. Kalpana revealed that she was indeed a descendant of Vishkanya. For generations, daughters in her family were used as a weapon to destroy kingdoms and cities. Kalpana urges her to kill each and every member of Mittal's family, especially Malay to hurt his mother. Years ago, Malay's father married Kalpana despite having another wife, Malay's mother. Enraged, Malay's mother gun-hired a man to kill Kalpana but he mistakenly harms Kalpana's sister and Aparajita's mother causing Malay's father and Aparajita's mother to be paralyzed.

Kalpana swore revenge on Nandhita Mittal by planning to make Malay fall in love with Aparajita and then dispose of him later. Aparajita was disturbed by the fact but she could not find in her heart to do as her mother asked and distanced herself from him. Malay, however, kept relentlessly pursuing her without knowing the reason. Against all the odds, they both fell for each other, but Malay's mother plotted many evil schemes to separate them.

In the end, Malay reluctantly marries Vardaan due to some misunderstanding caused by his mother and under the influence of the rest of his family. In the sequences of the story, Malay had a change of heart and begins to love Vardaan much to Aparajita's dismay as he instantly breaks up with her after that. By some tricks she had up her sleeves and with Kalpana's aid, Aparajita (Appu) managed to marry Malay but at this point he does not love her anymore and still remains unaware of her supernatural identity. Vardaan divorces Malay under the influence of Appu, and Malay is then forced to marry Appu but Vardaan saves Apu's life and Appu let's Vardaan and Malay to be together.

Apu tells her about her supernatural identity. Just before Malay and Vardaan's wedding, Kasturi (Assistant of Black Shadow, the head of all evil) come to kill Appu but Vardaan comes in the way and then Appu kills Kasturi. Vardaan makes Appu promise to take care of Malay after her and she passes out.

The show takes a 3-month leap and introduce Mandira, Nandita Mittal's sister who is killed by the Black Shadow.

The Black Shadow takes Mandira's form and comes to Mittal Mansion where she kills Chiki, Avi Mittal's fiancée. Black Shadow (who is made up of smoke) calls her another assistant, Yakshini who is the embodiment of lust. Yakshini comes to Mittal Mansion as Laila which is soon to marry Avi. Appu find them suspicious and she manages to burn Yakshini's house i.e. tree. (It is believed that a Yakshini's powers are in its house) and then Black Shadow kidnaps Kalpana and orders Apu to get intimate with Malay as Appu's offspring will free the Black Shadow from old-age curse and will give it powers. Malay heard them talking and Malay and Appu pretend that they got intimate and fake Malay's death (as getting intimate with a Vishkanya results in death). Appu tells Black Shadow to let her meet her aunt and she agreed.

There, Appu kills Black Shadow and she decides to go to Himalayas and spend her life there. Malay realises his love for Appu and stops her. Then Baba (Priest) comes with a rabbit and orders Appu to kill it. Appu scratches it but nothing happens, then Baba tells her that Goddess has taken her venom out of her body in return to Black Shadow's death and now she can live in peace. Appu and Malay get married and they live together, happily.

Cast and characters

Main 
 Aishwarya Khare as Aparajita "Appu" Malay Mittal/Vishkanya
 Vin Rana as Malay Mittal

Recurring 
 Rohini Banerjee as Kalpana Ghosh: Appu's Aunt
 Prachi Sinha as Vardaan Malay Mittal/Veda
 Kashish Duggal Paul as Nandita Mittal: Malay's mother
 Ashlesha Sawant as Mandira/Kala Saaya
 Ekta Sharma as Kumkum Rasik Mittal: Avi's mother; Malay's aunt
 Amit Khanna as Rasik Mittal: Avi's father; Malay's uncle
 Simi Mukherjee as Niranjana Ghosh: Appu's mother
 Medha Bhattacharya as Tapur Ghosh: Appu's cousin
 Gagan Singh as Avinash "Avi" Mittal: Malay's cousin
 Krishna Shetty as Arjun Jha: Appu's ex-fiancé
 Himani Shivpuri as Renu
 Nirmal Soni as Atosh: Malay's uncle
 Tanveer as Sunder: Malay's uncle
 Akash Pandey as Nigam: Malay's uncle
 Nishikant Dixit as Madan: Malay's uncle
 Annie Gill as Kanika: Malay's ex-fiancée
 Ekroop Bedi as Yakshini/Laila: Avi's fiancé

References

External links 
 Official Website

Zee TV original programming
Hindi-language television shows
2016 Indian television series debuts
2016 Indian television series endings
Television shows set in Kolkata
Indian supernatural television series